Sheikh Shakhbut bin Dhiyab Al Nahyan was the Ruler of the Emirate of Abu Dhabi from 1793 to 1816, now part of the United Arab Emirates (UAE).

Political career
Sheikh Shakbut was the eldest son (or brother) of Sheikh Dhiyab bin Isa Al Nahyan who was the leader of the Bani Yas tribal confederation.

In 1761 Shakbut's father, Dhiyab bin Isa, sent a hunting party from Liwa which tracked a gazelle to a brackish spring on the island. According to legend, the gazelle became the symbol of Abu Dhabi, and gave it its name (literally Father of the Gazelle). In 1793, Dhiyab ordered Shakbut to move to the island; he did, and built a village and fort there near a freshwater spring.  The fort, Qasr al-Hosn, became the palace of the sheikhs. It housed the Centre for Documentation and Research for several years, and is now a museum. By Shakhbut's reign, Abu Dhabi had expanded to some 400 houses.

Successors
He was followed by his sons Mohammed bin Shakhbut (ruled 1816–1818), Tahnun bin Shakhbut (ruled 1818–1833), Khalifa bin Shakhbut Al Nahyan (ruled 1833–1845), but co-ruled throughout all their reigns. Hilal and Yafoor are identified as his sons in the 1845 Memoranda on the Tribes of the Arabian Shores of the Persian Gulf of Lieutenant AB Kembal, Assistant Resident at Bushire.

Legacy
He has been described as legendary, and having a notable amount of sons. He was deposed by his son.

References 

House of Al Nahyan
1793 births
1816 deaths
Sheikhs of Abu Dhabi
18th-century Arabs